Andrey Teteryuk is a Kazakhstani former professional road bicycle racer who represented his country at the Olympic games.

Major results

1987
1st Stage 5 Vuelta a Colombia
1989
1st  Overall Giro Ciclistico d'Italia
1st Stage 1 Okolo Slovenska
7th Overall Course de la Paix
1991
9th Overall Tour d'Armorique
1992
1st Milano-Vignola
1st Stage 4 Tour of Britain
1993
7th Trofeo Matteotti
1994
3rd Memorial Gastone Nencini
1995
6th Overall Tour DuPont
9th Overall Tour de Suisse
1996
1st Giro del Friuli
1st Stage 4 Tour de Suisse
1997
4th Overall Tour de Romandie
5th Overall Critérium du Dauphiné Libéré
1st Stage 7
10th Overall Vuelta a Burgos
10th Overall Tour of Galicia
1998
3rd Overall Critérium du Dauphiné Libéré
4th Classique des Alpes
4th Overall Euskal Bizikleta
8th GP du canton d'Argovie
9th Overall Vuelta a Burgos
1999
 National Road Championships
1st  Road race
3rd Time trial
2nd Overall Tour of Galicia
3rd Overall Critérium International
2000
1st  Overall Tour of Galicia
1st Stage 2
3rd Road race, National Road Championships
6th Time trial, Olympic Games
9th Time trial, UCI Road World Championships
2001
5th Overall GP du Midi-Libre
1st Stage 3 (ITT)
2002
8th Giro del Lago Maggiore
8th Overall Giro del Trentino

Grand Tour general classification results timeline

References

External links

Cyclists at the 1996 Summer Olympics
Cyclists at the 2000 Summer Olympics
Kazakhstani male cyclists
Olympic cyclists of Kazakhstan
1967 births
Living people
Sportspeople from Astana
Tour de Suisse stage winners
Asian Games medalists in cycling
Cyclists at the 2002 Asian Games
Medalists at the 2002 Asian Games
Asian Games gold medalists for Kazakhstan
Kazakhstani people of Russian descent
21st-century Kazakhstani people